"Another Chance" is a song by American house producer and DJ Roger Sanchez. The song is based on a sample of "I Won't Hold You Back" by Toto. Released in July 2001 as the second single from Sanchez's debut studio album, First Contact (2001), "Another Chance" became a worldwide hit, peaking at number one in Romania and the United Kingdom and reaching the top 10 in Denmark, Ireland, the Netherlands, Norway, Portugal, and Spain.

Background
In an interview with DJ Mag, Sanchez indicated that it was one of the last tracks he created for his album, thinking that the album needed a "good underground track." Sanchez had purchased several vinyl records at a store in Montreal, and one of the records was American rock band Toto's 1982 album Toto IV. When exploring sampling ideas for the album, Sanchez came across the hook "If I had another chance tonight" from "I Won't Hold You Back", which he sampled for "Another Chance".

Critical reception
Michael Jørgensen of Radio Silkeborg in Denmark said of the song, "It's a great track, maybe not the most intelligent words, but the sound is very catchy. Once you've heard it, you can't get it out of your head!"

Music video
The music video, written and directed by Philippe Andre, is a short film with constant background noise and live dialogue playing over the track. Set in the dark hours in New York, the short film tracks the story of a young woman (Kelly Hutchinson) looking for love in the big city. She struggles around the streets, carrying a huge red plastic heart. She attempts to make conversation with a number of passing strangers. Her big heart is thrown back in her face, as all those that pass her by respond with an odd glare. Then, the accumulation of all the rejection makes her heart shrink down to a tiny size. A handsome man (Joshua Dov) then approaches her to ask her out for coffee, and in the following shot her heart is shown to have grown back to its original size. Philippe Andre ended up with a video that was a minute and a half longer than the track, due to the inclusion of a long dialogue-only scene in the middle. The film was shot over two nights in New York City. The original footage was shot on 16 mm film.

The music video received a 20-year anniversary remastered re-release in association with Ministry of Sound in July 2021, coinciding with Sanchez's "Another Chance to Dance" tour. A special edition, collector's vinyl picture-disc was also released for the anniversary.

Track listings

Canadian promo 12-inch vinyl
A1. "Another Chance" (Tom De Neef Vocal Mix) – 7:33
A2. "Another Chance" (Tom De Neef Dub) – 7:50
B1. "Another Chance" (Miquel Migs Naked Nite Time Rework) – 5:58
B2. "Another Chance" (Darknite Mix) – 7:31
B3. "Another Chance" (original mix) – 7:00

UK 12-inch single
A1. "Another Chance" (original mix)
B1. "Another Chance" (S-Man's Dark Nite Mix)
B2. "Another Chance" (Afterlife Mix)

UK enhanced CD single
 "Another Chance" (original edit)
 "Another Chance" (Afterlife Mix)
 "Another Chance" (S-Man's Dark Nite Mix)
 "Another Chance" (video)

UK cassette single
 "Another Chance" (original edit)
 "Another Chance" (Afterlife Mix)

European CD single
 "Another Chance" (radio edit)
 "Another Chance" (Tom De Neef Vocal Mix)
 "Another Chance" (S-Man's Dark Nite Mix)
 "Another Chance" (Afterlife Mix)

'''European enhanced maxi-single
 "Another Chance" (radio edit)
 "Another Chance" (Mr G's Last Chance Mix Edit)
 "Another Chance" (Miguel Migs Naked Time Rework)
 "Another Chance" (video directors cut)

Charts

Weekly charts

Year-end charts

Certifications

Release history

See also
 List of Romanian Top 100 number ones of the 2000s

References

External links
 Video of  this song on Vimeo

2001 songs
2001 singles
Dance Pool singles
Number-one singles in Romania
Roger Sanchez songs
Songs written by Steve Lukather
Sony Music singles
UK Singles Chart number-one singles